Masdevallia angulifera is a species of orchid endemic to the Western Cordillera and the Central Cordillera of Colombia in northern South America.

References

External links 

angulifera
Endemic orchids of Colombia